The following low-power television stations broadcast on digital or analog channel 43 in the United States:

 K43HD-D in Quanah, Texas, to move to channel 35
 K43JE-D in Lake Crystal, Minnesota, to move to channel 25
 K43JQ-D in Bismarck, North Dakota, to move to channel 23
 K43LK-D in Lawton, Oklahoma, to move to channel 34
 K43MH-D in Vesta, Minnesota, to move to channel 34
 KYHT-LD in Lake Charles, Louisiana, to move to channel 14

The following stations, which are no longer licensed, formerly broadcast on digital or analog channel 43:
 K43AE in Myton, etc., Utah
 K43AF in Ukiah, California
 K43AG-D in Edwards, California
 K43AK in English Bay, Alaska
 K43DA in Eureka, Utah
 K43ED-D in New Mobeetie, Texas
 K43EG-D in Pitkin, Colorado
 K43EV in Emery, Utah
 K43GN in Delta/Oak City, etc., Utah
 K43GY in Yakima, etc., Washington
 K43IJ in Wayne County (Rural), Utah
 K43LV-D in Chalfant Valley, California
 K43NU-D in Follett, Texas
 K43NZ-D in Port Orford, Oregon
 KBMT-LD in Beaumont, Texas
 KCHD-CA in Cheyenne, Wyoming
 KDUO-LP in Palm Desert, California
 KELM-LP in Reno, Nevada
 KRPG-LP in Des Moines, Iowa
 W43BO in Marion, etc., Virginia
 W43DL-D in Montgomery, Alabama
 WADA-LD in Wilmington, North Carolina
 WAJN-LP in Brookston, Indiana
 WBTD-LD in Suffolk, Virginia
 WBXT-CA in Tallahassee, Florida
 WKAG-CA in Hopkinsville, Kentucky
 WLEP-LD in Erie, Pennsylvania

References

43 low-power